is a train station located in Yanagawa, Fukuoka.

Lines 
Nishi-Nippon Railroad
Tenjin Ōmuta Line

Platforms

Adjacent stations

Surrounding area
 Kamachi Tateishi housing complex
 Kamachi Elementary School and Junior High School
 Kamachi Post Office
 Omuta Shinkin Bank Kamachi Branch
 JA Yanagawa Bank Kamachi Branch
 Zuisenin

Railway stations in Fukuoka Prefecture
Railway stations in Japan opened in 1937